A sequence of six consecutive nines occurs in the decimal representation of the number pi, starting at the 762nd decimal place. It has become famous because of the mathematical coincidence and because of the idea that one could memorize the digits of  up to that point, which seems to suggest that  is rational. The earliest known mention of this idea occurs in Douglas Hofstadter's 1985 book Metamagical Themas, where Hofstadter states

This sequence of six nines is sometimes called the "Feynman point", after physicist Richard Feynman, who allegedly stated this same idea in a lecture. It is not clear when, or even if, Feynman made such a statement, however; it is not mentioned in published biographies or in his autobiographies, and is unknown to his biographer, James Gleick.

Related statistics
 is conjectured, but not known, to be a normal number. For a normal number sampled uniformly at random, the probability of a specific sequence of six of a specific digit occurring this early in the decimal representation is about 0.08%, but the probability of finding six of any digit this early is about 0.8%.

The early string of six 9's is also the first occurrence of four and five consecutive identical digits. The next sequence of six consecutive identical digits is again composed of 9's, starting at position 193,034. The next distinct sequence of six consecutive identical digits starts with the digit 8 at position 222,299.

The positions of the first occurrence of a string of 1, 2, 3, 4, 5, 6, 7, 8, and 9 consecutive 9's in the decimal expansion are 5; 44; 762; 762; 762; 762; 1,722,776; 36,356,642; and 564,665,206, respectively .

Decimal expansion

See also

 0.999...
 9 (number)
 Mathematical coincidence
 Repdigit
 Ramanujan's constant

References

External links
 Feynman Point Mathworld Article – From the Mathworld project.

Pi
Recreational mathematics
Richard Feynman